John Purdue (13 June 1910 – 25 January 1985) was a New Zealand cricketer. He played two first-class matches for Otago in 1938–39.

See also
 List of Otago representative cricketers

References

External links
 

1910 births
1985 deaths
New Zealand cricketers
Otago cricketers
Cricketers from Invercargill